A stimulus bill is a government program providing economic stimulus.

Stimulus bill may also refer to:

 Chinese economic stimulus program, China
 ROC consumer voucher, Taiwan
 Triple Stimulus Voucher, China
 July Jobs Stimulus, Ireland
 Kenya Economic Stimulus Program, Kenya
 Thai Khem Khaeng, Thailand
 CARES Act, U.S.
 American Recovery and Reinvestment Act of 2009, U.S.
 American Rescue Plan Act of 2021, U.S.
 Economic Stimulus Appropriations Act of 1977, U.S.
 Economic Stimulus Act of 2008, U.S.